Đại Lộc is a rural district (huyện) of Quảng Nam province in the South Central Coast region of Vietnam. As of 2003 the district had a population of 158,052. The district covers an area of 586 km2. The district capital lies at Ái Nghĩa.

Divisions 
Đại Lộc has 17 communes: Đại Đồng, Đại Hiệp, Đại Nghĩa, Đại An, Đại Quang, Đại Lãnh, Đại Hưng, Đại Minh, Đại Cường, Đại Thạnh, Đại Thắng, Đại Phong, Đại Hồng, Đại Hòa, Đại Chánh, Đại Tân and Đại Sơn.

Geography 
Đại Lộc district is 25 km southwest of Da Nang, 70 km north of Tam Kỳ, and is located on the East-West Economic Corridor that, apart from Vietnam, also goes through Myanmar, Thailand and Laos. It borders the districts of Điện Bàn, Duy Xuyên, Quế Sơn, Nam Giang and Đông Giang. Đại Lộc District can be considered the main rice area of Quảng Nam Province. In addition, it is famous for numerous craft products, such as rice pancakes, drums, silk and incense sticks. Đại Lộc district has become an attractive venue for investors with 18 small and medium industrial groups and 36 projects in operation. The district contains beautiful springs, traditional craft villages, local festivals and the great sense of humor of local residents.

Tourism

Places, landmarks and events

Suối Mơ
Bang Am Ecotourism Zone
Khe Lim Ravine
Numerous creeks and waterfalls such as Gieo Waterfall, Dream Spring and Lim Mountain Creek
Sailing boat festival (Vu Gia River)

References

External links 
website

Districts of Quảng Nam province